Didmar Duro (born 18 August 1993) is an Albanian football player. He played as a defender for Besa Kavajë football club in Albania's First Division.

References

1993 births
Living people
Footballers from Kavajë
Albanian footballers
Association football defenders
Besa Kavajë players
KF Luz i Vogël 2008 players
KS Sopoti Librazhd players